There is also a Port Maitland in the province of Nova Scotia; see  Port Maitland, Nova Scotia.

Port Maitland is a community of approximately 100 people in Haldimand County, Ontario, Canada. It is on the North shore of Lake Erie at the mouth of the Grand River.

At one time a canal connected the Welland Canal to the Grand River.
It was once a thriving commercial fishing village.
It is the home of the former Maitland Arms Hotel, a thriving rock n' roll venue from the late 1960s to mid 1970s.

Economy

Port Maitland is home to International Marine Salvage. IMS was responsible for the scrapping of two Oberon-class submarines HMCS Okanagan and HMS Olympus (S12) for the Royal Canadian Navy.

External links 
 Photos of the mouth of the Grand River

Communities in Haldimand County
Populated places on Lake Erie in Canada
Populated places on the Grand River (Ontario)